The Fatal Night is a 1948 British thriller film directed by Mario Zampi and starring Lester Ferguson, Jean Short and Leslie Armstrong. It is based on a 1925 short story, 'The Gentleman from America', by Michael Arlen about an American visitor to London who makes a bet with two Englishmen that he cannot spend a night alone in a 'haunted' house. The same story, under the original title, was adapted in 1956 as an episode of the TV series Alfred Hitchcock Presents.

Cast
 Lester Ferguson as Puce  
 Jean Short as Geraldine  
 Leslie Armstron as Cyril  
 Brenda Hogan as Julia  
 Patrick Macnee as Tony  
 Aubrey Mallalieu as Yokel

References

Bibliography
 Chibnall, Steve & McFarlane, Brian. The British 'B' Film. Palgrave MacMillan, 2009.

External links

1948 films
British thriller films
1940s thriller films
Films set in London
Films directed by Mario Zampi
British black-and-white films
1940s English-language films
1940s British films